John Hutton was an English priest in the late 17th and early 18th centuries.

Hutchinson  was  born in Sedgwick and educated at The Queen's College, Oxford. He held livings at Hannington, Farthingstone and  Wappenham. He was Archdeacon of Stow from 1683 until his death on 29 April 1712.

References

1712 deaths
Alumni of St John's College, Oxford
Archdeacons of Stow
18th-century English Anglican priests
17th-century English Anglican priests